Isa Ali oghlu Mammadov (July 11, 1926 — August 10, 2007) was an Azerbaijani statesman, secretary of the Central Committee of the Communist Party of Azerbaijan (1981–1987), First Secretary of the Lankaran City Committee (1970–1981), Minister of Culture of the Nakhchivan ASSR (1965–1970), Hero of Socialist Labor (1976), Honored Teacher of the Azerbaijan SSR (1964), doctor of psychological sciences (2006).

Biography 
Isa Mammadov was born on July 11, 1926, in Aralig village, Sharur District, Nakhchivan Autonomous Republic. After graduating from the Sharur district central secondary school in 1942, he studied at the Moscow Higher Komsomol School in 1945–1947, and received higher education at the Azerbaijan Pedagogical Institute in 1947–1950. In 1972–1977, Isa Mammadov attended the Moscow Higher Party School.

Isa Mammadov, who started his career in 1943–1944 at the secondary school in Sharur district, was the first secretary of the Sharur district Komsomol committee in 1944–1945, in 1947-1953 he was the secretary and then the first secretary of the Nakhchivan regional Komsomol committee, in 1953-1961 he was the head of the Nakhchivan city and district education departments, in 1961-1965 he was the director of the Nakhchivan city boarding school, in 1965-1970 he served as the Minister of Culture of the Nakhchivan Autonomous Republic, the first secretary of the Lankaran city party committee in 1970–1981, the secretary of the Central Committee of the Communist Party of Azerbaijan in 1981–1987, and the director of the Baku Pedagogical Personnel Training and Retraining Institute from 1988 until the end of his life.

Isa Mammadov defended his candidate's theses in 1997 and his doctoral theses in 2006. He worked effectively in the organization of psychological services in general education schools and in the field of training practical psychologists.

In 1976, he was awarded the title of Hero of Socialist Labour, one of the highest titles of the Soviet era, and was awarded with a number of orders and medals.

Isa Ali oghlu Mammadov died on August 10, 2007, at the age of 82.

Awards 
 Hero of Socialist Labour — 1976
 Personal Pension of the President of the Republic of Azerbaijan — October 2, 2002

References 

1926 births
2007 deaths
Azerbaijan Communist Party (1920) politicians
Heroes of Socialist Labour
Recipients of the Order of Lenin
Recipients of the Order of the Red Banner of Labour